Leonard Joseph Cariou  (born September 30, 1939) is a Canadian actor and stage director, best known for his portrayal of Sweeney Todd in the original cast of Sweeney Todd: The Demon Barber of Fleet Street, for which he won the Tony Award for Best Actor in a Musical, and for playing the patriarch Henry Reagan, NYPD Police Commissioner (retired), in the multi-generational television series Blue Bloods on CBS.

Early years
Leonard Joseph Cariou was born on September 30, 1939, in St. Boniface, Manitoba. Cariou's father was Breton and his mother was of Irish descent. Cariou attended Miles Macdonell Collegiate for grades 10 and 11, where he directed and starred in the school plays, and he later attended St Paul's College.

Career
Cariou made his first appearance in Damn Yankees at Rainbow Stage in Winnipeg in 1959, and was a founding member of the Manitoba Theatre Centre. He was offered a scholarship at the National Theatre School of Canada in Montreal but, married with a young child and financial responsibilities, he was forced to decline the honor. Instead, he learned his craft by spending two years at the Stratford Shakespeare Festival in Stratford, Ontario, and returned in 1981 to lead the company as Prospero, Coriolanus, Brutus, and Petruchio. 

Cariou also became a lead actor at the Tyrone Guthrie Theatre  in Minneapolis in the 1960s, where he played Orlando in As You Like It; Agamemnon in Tyrone Guthrie's compilation of The House of Atreus; Iago; Oberon; and the title roles in Henry V, Oedipus the King, and King Lear. He also was an associate director.

Broadway 
 
In 1968, Cariou made his Broadway debut in The House of Atreus. Two years later, Cariou landed his first starring role opposite Lauren Bacall in Applause, a musical adaptation of the film All About Eve. It earned him a Tony Award nomination as Best Actor in a Musical and won him the Theatre World Award. In 1973, he received his second Tony nomination for A Little Night Music; he reprised the role of Fredrik for the 1977 film version opposite Elizabeth Taylor. Six years later he won both the Tony and Drama Desk Award for his portrayal of Sweeney Todd: The Demon Barber of Fleet Street in the Stephen Sondheim musical opposite Angela Lansbury. During these years, Cariou also appeared in a number of benefits, including A Christmas Carol for the Riverside Shakespeare Company in New York, playing Scrooge, with Helen Hayes, Raul Julia, and Mary Elizabeth Mastrantonio, directed by W. Stuart McDowell at the Symphony Space in 1985. His next projects included the Alan Jay Lerner–Charles Strouse musical Dance a Little Closer (1983), Arthur Miller's sole musical, Up from Paradise (1983), Teddy & Alice (1987), and Ziegfeld (1988). Cariou also appeared on Broadway in Night Watch, Cold Storage, The Speed of Darkness, Neil Simon's The Dinner Party (with Henry Winkler and John Ritter) and Proof (with Anne Heche and Neil Patrick Harris). He directed Don't Call Back on Broadway as well. His off-Broadway appearances include Master Class, Papa (an Ernest Hemingway one-man show) and Mountain (Justice William O. Douglas).  He appeared as Cap'n Andy in the Broadway national tour of Show Boat opposite Cloris Leachman.

Regional theatre 
Regionally, Cariou has starred in many productions at theatres throughout North America, including The Kennedy Centre, the Mark Taper Forum, Lincoln Centre, the Long Wharf Theatre and the Old Globe. He has played the title role of Macbeth for Toronto Arts Productions, and Richard Nixon in Frost/Nixon for Canadian Stage in Toronto. He has appeared multiple times throughout his career at the Manitoba Theatre Centre. In 1984, having directed "Death of a Salesman" at the Citadel Theater, Edmonton, he played the lead in "King Lear" and was appointed associate director.  In 1985 he played Stalin there in David Pownall's "Master Class". Cariou appeared at The Geffen Theatre as Joe Keller in a notable production of All My Sons, a role he reprised in 2009 at the Gate Theatre in Dublin, where it was the longest-running, highest-grossing run of a play in that theatre's history. He also appeared at The Geffen in Neil Simon's Rose and Walsh and Heroes with George Segal.

Television 
From 1985 to 1992, Cariou appeared in multiple episodes of the popular television mystery series Murder, She Wrote with his friend and former Sweeney Todd co-star Angela Lansbury. Cariou portrayed the recurring character of Michael Hagarty, characterized as an Irish international man of mystery who worked as a secret agent for British MI-6. He would get Jessica Fletcher (Angela Lansbury), the title character of the show, involved in mysteries involving international intrigue.

In 1993, Cariou was in the TV movie Miracle on Interstate 880. He played Buck Helm. He also guest-starred in an episode of North of 60 when he portrayed Sarah Birkett's estranged father.

In 1995, Cariou became the first actor to portray Walt Disney in the Annette Funicello biography A Dream Is a Wish Your Heart Makes: The Annette Funicello Story, based on her book of the same name.

In 1997, Cariou appeared in the Star Trek: Voyager episode "Coda". He appeared to Captain Kathryn Janeway as an alien disguised as Admiral Janeway, her deceased father.

In 2010, Cariou appeared as Madoff-like Ponzi scheme man Louis Tobin in the drama Damages, the main antagonist in season three. Cariou has appeared in episodes of The West Wing, Law & Order, The Practice, and The Outer Limits. He had a continuing role in 2006–2007 as power broker Judd Fitzgerald in the series Brotherhood.

He currently appears as Henry Reagan, the former New York City Police Commissioner and patriarch of the current commissioner's family on Blue Bloods.

Film 
Cariou's film credits include One Man, Flags of Our Fathers, About Schmidt, Thirteen Days, The Four Seasons, the Harold Prince-directed screen adaptation of A Little Night Music with Elizabeth Taylor, and Secret Window in which he starred alongside Johnny Depp, who would later go on to play Sweeney Todd in Sweeney Todd: The Demon Barber of Fleet Street, the Tim Burton-directed musical based on the Broadway show in which Cariou starred. He played the father in the 2007 film 1408, and the nominal lead role in The Onion Movie, based on the satirical newspaper. In 2018 he starred alongside Bruce Willis in Death Wish as Dr. Paul Kersey's father-in-law.

Cariou narrated Major League Baseball's World Series films from 1992 to 1997. In addition, he was the narrator of "An Amazin' Era", a video commemorating the 25th anniversary of the New York Mets franchise. He narrated both the original 1986 version and an update that was produced in 1989. He has recorded a number of books, including several by Michael Connelly, for audiotape release. He also narrated the 1989 Academy Award-winning documentary The Johnstown Flood. In 2009, Cariou portrayed Franklin D. Roosevelt in the HBO movie Into the Storm, earning an Emmy nomination for Outstanding Supporting Actor in a Miniseries or a Movie.  He played an American naval officer in 2013's den Orolige Mannen (the Troubled Man), adapted from one of Henning Mankell's Kurt Wallander novels.

More recently, Cariou portrayed Cardinal Law in Spotlight, which won the Academy Award for Best Picture of 2015. He also starred in the short play Happy Birthday, Mr. Abernathy by Lloyd Suh for a public radio show and podcast, Playing On Air.

Awards 
On Broadway, Cariou has earned three Tony nominations for 'Best Actor in a Musical' in 1970 for Applause, in 1973 for A Little Night Music, and in 1979 for Sweeney Todd. He won the Tony for Best Performance By A Leading Actor in a Musical for his performance in Sweeney Todd.

In 2004, Cariou was inducted into the American Theater Hall of Fame.

In 2009, Cariou portrayed Franklin D. Roosevelt in the HBO movie Into the Storm, earning an Emmy nomination for Outstanding Supporting Actor in a Miniseries or a Movie. 

On June 23, 2012, Cariou was honored by having his name added to the Miles Macdonell Collegiate Alumni of Distinction, for his contribution to theater and arts. His introduction to the theater started with a starring role in the school production of The Pirates of Penzance. He holds the Order of Manitoba and has been invested with honorary degrees from the University of Windsor and the University of Winnipeg. 

On December 27, 2018, Julie Payette, Governor General of Canada, announced that Cariou would be one of 103 recipients becoming an Officer of the Order of Canada for his achievements as an actor of stage and screen, and for his commitment to Canadian cultural institutions.

Stage credits

As actor

As director

Filmography

Film

Television

Awards and nominations

References

External links
 
 
 

1939 births
Living people
Canadian male film actors
Canadian male singers
Canadian male musical theatre actors
Canadian male television actors
Canadian male voice actors
Drama Desk Award winners
Major League Baseball broadcasters
Members of the Order of Manitoba
Tony Award winners
Male actors from Winnipeg
Musicians from Winnipeg
Officers of the Order of Canada
People from Saint Boniface, Winnipeg
Canadian people of Breton descent
20th-century Canadian male actors
21st-century Canadian male actors
Best Actor Genie and Canadian Screen Award winners
Canadian artistic directors